Fannie Lou Hamer (Townsend; October 6, 1917 – March 14, 1977) was an American voting and women's rights activist, community organizer, and a leader in the civil rights movement. She was the vice-chair of the Freedom Democratic Party, which she represented at the 1964 Democratic National Convention. Hamer also organized Mississippi's Freedom Summer along with the Student Nonviolent Coordinating Committee (SNCC). She was also a co-founder of the National Women's Political Caucus, an organization created to recruit, train, and support women of all races who wish to seek election to government office.

Hamer began civil rights activism in 1962, continuing until her health declined nine years later. She was known for her use of spiritual hymns and quotes and her resilience in leading the civil rights movement for black women in Mississippi. She was extorted, threatened, harassed, shot at, and assaulted by racists, including members of the police, while trying to register for and exercise her right to vote. She later helped and encouraged thousands of African-Americans in Mississippi to become registered voters and helped hundreds of disenfranchised people in her area through her work in programs like the Freedom Farm Cooperative. She unsuccessfully ran for the U.S. Senate in 1964, losing to John C. Stennis, and the Mississippi State Senate in 1971. In 1970, she led legal action against the government of Sunflower County, Mississippi for continued illegal segregation.

Hamer died on March 14, 1977, aged 59, in Mound Bayou, Mississippi. Her memorial service was widely attended and her eulogy was delivered by U.S. Ambassador to the United Nations Andrew Young. She was posthumously inducted into the National Women's Hall of Fame in 1993.

Early life, family, and education
Fannie was born on October 6, 1917, in Montgomery County, Mississippi, the last of the 20 children of Ella and James Lee Townsend. 

In 1919, the Townsends moved to Sunflower County, Mississippi, to work as sharecroppers on W. D. Marlow's plantation. From age six, Fannie picked cotton with her family. During the winters of 1924 through 1930, she attended the one-room school provided for the sharecroppers' children, open between picking seasons. Fannie loved reading and excelled in spelling bees and reciting poetry, but at age 12 she had to leave school to help support her aging parents. By age 13, she would pick 200–300 pounds (90 to 140 kg) of cotton daily while living with polio.

Fannie continued to develop her reading and interpretation skills in Bible study at her church; in later years Lawrence Guyot admired her ability to connect "the biblical exhortations for liberation and [the struggle for civil rights] any time that she wanted to and move in and out to any frames of reference". In 1944, after the plantation owner discovered her literacy, she was selected as its time and record keeper. The following year she married Perry "Pap" Hamer, a tractor driver on the Marlow plantation, and they remained there for the next 18 years.

Hamer and her husband wanted very much to start a family but in 1961, a white doctor subjected Hamer to a hysterectomy without her consent while she was undergoing surgery to remove a uterine tumor. Forced sterilization was a common method of population control in Mississippi that targeted poor, African-American women. Members of the Black community called the procedure a "Mississippi appendectomy". The Hamers later raised two girls they adopted, eventually adopting two more. One, Dorothy Jean, died at age 22 of internal hemorrhaging after she was denied admission to the local hospital because of her mother's activism.

Hamer became interested in the civil rights movement in the 1950s. She heard leaders of the local movement speak at annual Regional Council of Negro Leadership (RCNL) conferences, held in Mound Bayou, Mississippi. The attendees of the yearly conferences discussed black voting rights and other civil rights issues black communities in the area faced.

Civil rights activism

White racist attacks

She was fired by her boss, but her husband was required to stay on the land until the end of the harvest. Hamer moved between homes over the next several days for protection. On September 10, while staying with friend Mary Tucker, Hamer was shot at 15 times in a drive-by shooting by racists. No one was injured in the event. The next day Hamer and her family evacuated to nearby Tallahatchie County for three months, fearing retaliation by the Ku Klux Klan for her attempt to vote.

Registering to vote

On August 31, 1962, Hamer and 17 others attempted to vote but failed a literacy test, which meant they were denied this right. On December 4, just after returning to her hometown, she went to the courthouse in Indianola to take the test again, but failed and was turned away. Hamer told the registrar, "You'll see me every 30 days till I pass". On January 10, 1963, she took the test a third time. She was successful and was informed that she was now a registered voter in Mississippi. But when she attempted to vote that fall, she discovered her registration gave her no actual power to vote as her county also required voters to have two poll tax receipts. This requirement had emerged in some (mostly former Confederate) states after the right to vote was first given to all races by the 1870 ratification of the Fifteenth Amendment to the United States Constitution. These laws, along with the literacy tests and local government acts of coercion, were used against blacks and Native Americans. Hamer later paid for and acquired the requisite poll tax receipts.

Hamer began to become more involved in the Student Nonviolent Coordinating Committee after these incidents. She attended many Southern Christian Leadership Conferences (SCLC), where she sometimes taught classes, and various SNCC (pronounced "Snick") workshops. She traveled to gather signatures for petitions to attempt to be granted federal resources for impoverished black families across the South. In early 1963, she became a SNCC field secretary for voter registration and welfare programs. Many of these first attempts to register more black voters in Mississippi were met with the same problems Hamer had found in trying to register herself.

Police brutality
On June 9, 1963, Hamer was returning from a voter registration workshop by the Southern Christian Leadership Conference (SCLC) in Charleston, South Carolina. Traveling by bus with co-activists, they stopped for a break in Winona, Mississippi. Some of the activists went inside a local cafe, but were refused service by the waitress. Shortly after, a Mississippi State highway patrolman took out his billy club and intimidated the activists into leaving. One of the group decided to take down the officer's license plate number; while doing so the patrolman and a police chief entered the cafe and arrested the party. Hamer left the bus and inquired if they could continue their journey back to Greenwood, Mississippi. At that point the officers arrested her as well. Once in county jail, Hamer's colleagues were beaten by the police in the booking room (including 15-year-old June Johnson, for not addressing officers as "sir"). Hamer was then taken to a cell where two inmates were ordered, by the state trooper, to beat her using a baton. The police ensured she was held down during the almost fatal beating, and when she started to scream, beat her further. Hamer was also groped repeatedly by officers during the assault. When she attempted to resist, she stated an officer, "walked over, took my dress, pulled it up over my shoulders, leaving my body exposed to five men". Another in her group was beaten until she was unable to talk; a third, a teenager, was beaten, stomped on, and stripped. An activist from SNCC came the next day to see if he could help but was beaten until his eyes were swollen shut when he did not address an officer in the expected deferential manner.

Hamer was released on June 12, 1963. She needed more than a month to recuperate from the beatings and never fully recovered. Though the incident left profound physical and psychological effects, including a blood clot over her left eye and permanent damage on one of her kidneys, Hamer returned to Mississippi to organize voter registration drives, including the 1963 Freedom Ballot, a mock election, and the "Freedom Summer" initiative the following year. She was known to the volunteers of Freedom Summer as a motherly figure who believed that the civil rights effort should be multi-racial in nature. In addition to her "Northern" guests, Hamer played host to Tuskegee University student activists Sammy Younge Jr. and Wendell Paris. Younge and Paris grew to become profound activists and organizers under Hamer's tutelage. (Younge was murdered in 1966 at a Standard Oil gas station in Macon County, Alabama, for using a "whites-only" restroom.)

Freedom Democratic Party and Congressional run

In 1964, Hamer helped co-found the Mississippi Freedom Democratic Party (MFDP), in an effort to prevent the regional all-white Democratic party's attempts to stifle African-American voices, and to ensure there was a party for all people that did not stand for any form of exploitation and discrimination (especially towards minorities). Following the founding of the MFDP, Hamer and other activists traveled to the 1964 Democratic National Convention to stand as the official delegation from the state of Mississippi. Hamer's televised testimony was interrupted because of a scheduled speech that President Lyndon B. Johnson gave to 30 governors in the White House East Room, but most major news networks broadcast her testimony later that evening to the nation, giving Hamer and the MFDP much exposure.

Senator Hubert Humphrey tried to propose a compromise on Johnson's behalf that would give the Freedom Democratic Party two seats. He said this would lead to a reformed convention in 1968. The MFDP rejected the compromise, with Hamer saying, "We didn't come all the way up here to compromise for no more than we'd gotten here. We didn't come all this way for no two seats when all of us is tired." Afterward, all the white members from the Mississippi delegation walked out.

In 1968, the MFDP was finally seated after the Democratic Party adopted a clause that demanded equality of representation from their states' delegations. In 1972, Hamer was elected as a national party delegate.

Rhetorical practices

Hamer traveled around the country speaking at various colleges, universities, and institutions. She was not rich, as confirmed by her clothing and vernacular. Moreover, Hamer was a short and stocky poor black woman with a deep southern accent, which gave rise to ridicule in the minds of many in her audiences. Although she often gave speeches, she was often patronized by both black and white people because she was not formally educated. For instance, activists like Roy Wilkins said Hamer was "ignorant", and President Lyndon B. Johnson looked down on her. When Hamer was being considered to speak as a delegate at the 1964 Democratic National Convention, Hubert Humphrey said, "The President will not allow that illiterate woman to speak from the floor of the convention." In 1964, Hamer received an honorary degree from Tougaloo College, much to the dismay of a group of black intellectuals who thought she was undeserving of such an honor because she was "unlettered". On the other hand, Hamer had supporters like Ella Baker, Bob Moses, Charles McLaurin, and Malcolm X who believed in her story and in her ability to speak. These supporters and others like them believed that despite Hamer's illiteracy, "People who have struggled to support themselves and large families, people who have survived in Georgia and Alabama and Mississippi, have learned some things we need to know." Hamer was known to evoke strong emotions in listeners to her speeches indicative of her "telling it like it is" oratorical style.

Hamer's style of speaking and connecting to audiences can be traced back to her upbringing and the black Baptist Church to which her family belonged, which many see as the source of her ability to compel audiences with words. Woven into her speeches was a deep level of confidence, biblical knowledge, and even comedy in a way that many did not think possible for someone without a formal education or access to "institutionalized power". Hamer witnessed her mother be brave enough to walk around with a concealed pistol to protect her children from white land owners who were known to beat sharecroppers' children. Moreover, Hamer's mother instilled a sense of pride in being black when Hamer did not see it as a benefit as a child. In addition, Hamer's father was a Baptist preacher who often entertained the family with jokes at the end of the day. Although Hamer only made it to the sixth grade because she had to help the family work the fields, she excelled greatly at reading, spelling, and poetry, and even won spelling bees. Her family encouraged her to recite her poetry to the family and their guests.

Hamer became a plantation timekeeper, a position that made her the point person who had to communicate with both the white land owners and the black sharecroppers, which helped her practice communicating to different kinds of people. After she got involved in the Civil Rights Movement in the early 1960s, Hamer's oratorical skills quickly became apparent; leading activists were amazed at how she did not write her speeches but delivered them from memory. The Reverend Edwin King said of Hamer, "She was an extraordinarily good cook of down-home foods...she liked to mix, to make whatever she was feeding people at midnight after they would come home from jail or somewhere else, to fix the perfect spices or recipe for her guest,...after she became the orator, she began picking and choosing the spicy parts she’d put in her speeches. She was always doing the best she had with whatever she had. The food, or words, or voice or song—choosing among it what was needed to persuade or to comfort or to please." When traveling to different speaking engagements, Hamer not only made speeches, but also sang, often with the Freedom Singers. Charles Neblitt, one of its members, said of Hamer, "We'd let her sing all the songs we did that she knew. She put her whole self into her singing, adding a power to the group...When somebody puts their inner self into a song, it moves people. Her singing showed the kind of dedication that she had—the struggle and the pain, the frustration and the hope... Her life would be in that song."

Hamer's "southern black vernacular", indicative of the denial of blacks', particularly black Southerners', access to standard American English captures the feelings and experiences of black Southerners despite of that lack of access. According to Davis Houck and Maegan Parker Brooks in The Speeches of Fannie Lou Hamer, "the designation 'black' acknowledges aspects of Hamer’s racialized experience that influenced her speech. When describing Hamer’s discourse, moreover, we find the term 'vernacular' more precise than either 'dialect' or 'language' because the etymology of 'vernacular'—taken from the Latin vernaculus and verna—evokes a sense of being both 'native to a region' and 'subservient to something else.' In this respect, 'vernacular' echoes the particularity indicated by the regional distinction, as it simultaneously represents the relationship of power and domination that Hamer challenged through her words."

One of Hamer's most famous speeches was at Williams Institutional Church in Harlem on December 20, 1964, along with Malcolm X. In the speech, "Sick and Tired of Being Sick and Tired", Hamer chronicled the violence and injustices she experienced while trying to register to vote. While highlighting the various acts of brutality she experienced in the South, she was careful to also tie in the fact that blacks in the North and all over the country were suffering the same oppression. The audience was one-third white and gave Hamer a warm reception.

Freedom Farm Cooperative and later activism

In 1964, Hamer unsuccessfully ran for a seat in the U.S. Senate. She continued to work on other projects, including grassroots-level Head Start programs and Martin Luther King, Jr.'s Poor People's Campaign. With the help of Julius Lester and Mary Varela, she published her autobiography in 1967. She said she was "tired of all this beating" and "there's so much hate. Only God has kept the Negro sane".

Hamer sought equality across all aspects of society. In Hamer's view, African-Americans were not technically free if they were not afforded the same opportunities as whites, including those in the agricultural industry. Sharecropping was the most common form of post-slavery activity and income in the South. The New Deal era expanded so that many blacks were physically and economically displaced due to the various projects appearing around the country. Hamer did not wish to have blacks be dependent on any group for any longer; so, she wanted to give them a voice through an agricultural movement.

Hamer was a staunch opponent of abortion, calling it "legalized murder" in a 1969 speech at the White House and describing her position in terms of her Christian faith. In Until I Am Free, historian Keisha N. Blain writes, Hamer viewed birth control and abortion as social justice issues. She feared that both were simply white supremacist tools to regulate the lives of impoverished Black people and even prevent the growth of the Black population.James Eastland, a white senator, was among the groups of people who sought to keep African-Americans disenfranchised and segregated from society. His influence on the overarching agricultural industry often suppressed minority groups to keep whites as the only power force in America. Hamer objected to this, and consequently pioneered the Freedom Farm Cooperative (FFC) in 1969, an attempt to redistribute economic power across groups and to solidify an economic standing amongst African-Americans. In the same vein as the Freedom Farm Collective, Hamer partnered with the National Council of Negro Women (NCNW) to establish an interracial and interregional support program called The Pig Project to provide protein for people who previously could not afford meat.

Hamer made it her mission to make land more accessible to African-Americans. To do this, she started a small "pig bank" with a starting donation from the NCNW of five boars and fifty gilts. Through the pig bank, a family could care for a pregnant female pig until it bore its offspring; subsequently, they would raise the piglets and use them for food and financial gain. Within five years, thousands of pigs were available for breeding. Hamer used the success of the bank to begin fundraising for the main farming corporation. She was able to convince the then-editor of the Harvard Crimson, James Fallows, to write an article that advocated for donations to the FFC. Eventually, the FFC had raised around $8,000 which allowed Hamer to purchase 40 acres of land previously owned by a black farmer who could no longer afford to occupy the land. This land became the Freedom Farm. The farm had three main objectives. These were to establish an agricultural organization that could supplement the nutritional needs of America's most disenfranchised people; to provide acceptable housing development; and to create an entrepreneurial business incubator that would provide resources for new companies and re-training for those with limited education but manual labor experience.

Over time, the FFC offered various other services such as financial counseling, a scholarship fund and a housing agency. The FFC aided in securing 35 Federal Housing Administration (FHA) subsidized houses for struggling black families. Through her success, Hamer managed to acquire a new home, which served as inspiration for others to begin building themselves up. The FFC ultimately disbanded in 1975 due to lack of funding.

In 1971, Hamer co-founded the National Women's Political Caucus. She emphasized the power women could hold by acting as a voting majority in the country regardless of race or ethnicity, saying "A white mother is no different from a black mother. The only thing is they haven't had as many problems. But we cry the same tears."

Later life and death
While having surgery in 1961 to remove a tumor, 44-year-old Hamer was also given a hysterectomy without consent by a white doctor; this was a frequent occurrence under Mississippi's compulsory sterilization plan to reduce the number of poor blacks in the state. Hamer is credited with coining the phrase "Mississippi appendectomy" as a euphemism for the involuntary or uninformed sterilization of black women, common in the South in the 1960s. She came out of an extended period in hospital for nervous exhaustion in January 1972, and was hospitalized again in January 1974 for a nervous breakdown. By June 1974, Hamer was said to be in extremely poor health. Two years later she was diagnosed with and had surgery for breast cancer.

Hamer died of complications from hypertension and breast cancer on March 14, 1977, aged 59, at Taborian Hospital, Mound Bayou, Mississippi. She was buried in her hometown of Ruleville, Mississippi. Her tombstone is engraved with one of her famous quotes, "I am sick and tired of being sick and tired."

Her primary memorial service, held at a church, was completely full. An overflow service was held at Ruleville Central High School, with over 1,500 people in attendance. Andrew Young, United States Ambassador to the United Nations, spoke at the RCHS service, saying "None of us would be where we are now had she not been there then".

Honors and awards

Hamer received many awards both in her lifetime and posthumously. She received a Doctor of Law from Shaw University, and honorary degrees from Columbia College Chicago in 1970 and Howard University in 1972. She was inducted into the National Women's Hall of Fame in 1993.

Hamer also received the Paul Robeson Award from Alpha Kappa Alpha sorority, the Mary Church Terrell Award from Delta Sigma Theta sorority, the National Sojourner Truth Meritorious Service Award. She is an honorary member of Delta Sigma Theta. A remembrance for her life was given in the US House of Representatives on the 100th anniversary of her birth, October 6, 2017, by Texas Congresswoman Sheila Jackson Lee.

Tributes

In 1970, Ruleville Central High School held a "Fannie Lou Hamer Day". Six years later, the City of Ruleville itself celebrated a "Fannie Lou Hamer Day". In 1977, Gil Scott-Heron and Brian Jackson wrote "95 South (All of the Places We've Been)", in Hamer's honor. Ta-Nehisi Coates described a 1994 live solo version of the song as "a haunting and somber ode".

In 1994, the Ruleville post office was named the Fannie Lou Hamer Post Office by an act of Congress. Additionally, The Fannie Lou Hamer National Institute on Citizenship and Democracy was founded in 1997 as a summer seminar and K–12 workshop program. In 2014 it was merged with the Council of Federated Organizations (COFO) Civil Rights Education Complex on the campus of Jackson State University, Jackson, to create the Fannie Lou Hamer Institute @ COFO: A Human and Civil Rights Interdisciplinary Education Center. The Hamer Institute @ COFO provides a research library and outreach programs. There is also a Fannie Lou Hamer Public Library in Jackson.

A 2012 collection of suites by trumpeter and composer Wadada Leo Smith, who grew up in segregated Mississippi, Ten Freedom Summers includes "Fannie Lou Hamer and the Mississippi Freedom Democratic Party, 1964" as one of its 19 suites. A picture book about Hamer's life, Voice of Freedom: Fannie Lou Hamer, Spirit of the Civil Rights Movement, was written by Carole Boston Weatherford; it won a Coretta Scott King Award. Hamer is also one of 28 civil rights icons depicted on the Buffalo, New York Freedom Wall. And a quote from Hamer's speech at the 1964 Democratic National Convention is carved on one of the eleven granite columns at the Civil Rights Garden in Atlantic City, where the convention was held.

Fannie Lou Hamer Freedom High School was formed in the Bronx, New York, with a focus on humanities and social justice.

In 2017 the Fannie Lou Hamer Black Resource Center opened at the University of California at Berkeley.

In 2018, the Mississippi Democratic Party's Jefferson-Jackson Dinner fundraiser was renamed the Hamer-Winter Dinner in honor of Hamer and former governor William Winter.

The third annual Women's March, held in Atlantic City, New Jersey on January 19, 2019, was dedicated to Hamer's life and legacy. Several hundred people attended, representing many organizations. Several students from Fannie Lou Hamer Freedom High School attended despite a state of emergency declared by New Jersey Governor Murphy due to an impending snowstorm.

The gardener and podcaster Colah B. Tawkin cites Hamer as inspiration.

Works
 Fannie Lou Hamer, Julius Lester, and Mary Varela, Praise Our Bridges: An Autobiography, 1967
 Hamer, Smithsonian Folkways Recordings, Songs My Mother Taught Me (album), 2015
 Hamer (2011). The Speeches of Fannie Lou Hamer: To Tell It Like It Is. University Press of Mississippi. . Cf.

See also

 African Americans in Mississippi
 Black women in American politics
 List of civil rights leaders

Citations

General references

Further reading

 Colman, Penny (1993). Fannie Lou Hamer and the Fight for the Vote. The Millbrook Press
 Kling, Susan (1979). Fannie Lou Hamer: A Biography. Chicago: Women for Racial and Economic Equality.
 
Lee, Chana Kai, For Freedom's Sake: The Life of Fannie Lou Hamer. 2000. 
 Mills, Kay (1993). This Little Light of Mine: The Life of Fannie Lou Hamer. New York: Dutton.
 Moye, J. Todd. Let the People Decide: Black Freedom and White Resistance Movements in Sunflower County, Mississippi, 1945–1986, University of North Carolina Press, 2004.
 O'Dell, Jack (1965). "Life in Mississippi: An Interview with Fannie Lou Hamer".
 Payne, Charles M. (1995). I've Got the Light of Freedom: The Organizing Tradition and the Mississippi Freedom Struggle. Berkeley: University of California Press. .
 Ware, Susan, and Stacy Lorraine Braukman. Notable American Women: A Biographical Dictionary - Completing the Twentieth Century. Belknap, 2005.
 Weatherford, Carole Boston, Voice of Freedom: Fannie Lou Hamer, Spirit of the Civil Rights Movement. Dreamscape Media, 2016.

External links

 
 “Fannie Lou Hamer Interview,” 1965-09-24, Pacifica Radio Archives, American Archive of Public Broadcasting (GBH and the Library of Congress), Boston, MA and Washington, DC, accessed June 7, 2021.
 SNCC Digital Gateway: Fannie Lou Hamer, Documentary website created by the SNCC Legacy Project and Duke University, telling the story of the Student Nonviolent Coordinating Committee and grassroots organizing from the inside-out.
 National Women's Hall of Fame and National Women’s History Museum entries
 "Fannie Lou Hamer", Ron Schuler's Parlour Tricks, October 6, 2005.
 Fannie Lou Hamer Collection (MUM00215) owned by the University of Mississippi, Archives and Special Collections.
 FBI file on Fannie Lou Hamer.
 Jerry DeMuth, "Fannie Lou Hamer: Tired of Being Sick and Tired", The Nation, April 2, 2009.
 Transcripts of eight important speeches made in the 1960s, including her testimony before the DNC credentialing committee. Published by The Fannie Lou Hamer Institute@COFO, Jackson State University as an online educational supplement to A Voice That Could Stir an Army: Fannie Lou Hamer and the Rhetoric of the Black Freedom Movement (2014), by Hamer scholar Maegan Parker Brooks.

1917 births
1977 deaths
African-American activists
20th-century African-American women
Activists for African-American civil rights
African-American history of Mississippi
African-American people in Mississippi politics
African-American women in politics
American anti–Vietnam War activists
American democracy activists
American people with disabilities
American civil rights activists
Deaths from breast cancer
Deaths from cancer in Mississippi
Delta Sigma Theta members
Mississippi Democrats
People from Montgomery County, Mississippi
People from Ruleville, Mississippi
Student Nonviolent Coordinating Committee
Victims of police brutality in the United States
Women civil rights activists
American civil rights activists (civil rights movement)
Anti-abortion activists